Thaddeus Moss (born May 14, 1998) is an American football tight end who is currently a free agent. He played college football at NC State before transferring to LSU, where he caught two touchdowns in their 2020 College Football Playoff National Championship game victory. Moss signed as an undrafted free agent with the Washington Football Team in 2020, but did not play with them due to injury and was released the following offseason. He is the son of Pro Football Hall of Fame wide receiver Randy Moss. Moss was formerly a member of the Washington Football Team and most recently the Cincinnati Bengals.

Early life and high school
Moss initially attended Boone County High School in Florence, Kentucky, where he caught 12 passes for 157 yards on offense and had 32 tackles on defense. He was coached by Greg Nieman, also known as YG who works for HitSeekers Sports Cards as a breaker on Loupe, while attending Boone County. He then transferred to St. Albans School in St. Albans, West Virginia midway through his freshman year. He attended Lincoln High School in Rhode Island for his sophomore year before moving to Charlotte, North Carolina as a junior. He attended Victory Christian Center as a junior and transferred to Mallard Creek High School for his senior year. As a senior, Moss caught 54 passes for 831 yards and 13 touchdowns. Moss committed to play college football at NC State over offers from Alabama, Florida, Georgia, Michigan and Texas A&M.

College career
Moss began his collegiate career at NC State. As a true freshman, he caught six passes for 49 yards and a touchdown.  Moss announced his intent to transfer during the summer after his freshman year and chose LSU. He missed the entire 2017 season due to NCAA transfer rules. He also missed the entire 2018 season due to a foot injury and was granted a medical redshirt.

As a redshirt junior, Moss finished the season with 47 receptions for 570 receiving yards, both school records for tight ends, and four touchdowns. Moss caught four passes for 99 yards and scored a touchdown on a 62-yard reception against Oklahoma in the 2019 Peach Bowl. In the 2020 National Championship Game, he scored two touchdowns on five receptions for 36 yards.  His two scores allowed quarterback and 2019 Heisman Trophy winner Joe Burrow to tie and break the NCAA single season record for touchdown passes. On January 17, 2020, Moss announced that he would forgo his senior year by declaring for the 2020 NFL Draft.

Statistics

Professional career

Washington Football Team
Moss signed with the Washington Football Team as an undrafted free agent following the 2020 NFL Draft, choosing them over the New England Patriots and Cincinnati Bengals. He was waived with an injury designation on August 21, 2020, and reverted to the team's injured reserve list the following day. Moss was waived on April 9, 2021.

Cincinnati Bengals
Moss was claimed off waivers by the Cincinnati Bengals on April 12, 2021.
This move reunited Moss with his former LSU teammates Joe Burrow and Ja'Marr Chase. He was waived on August 31, 2021. He signed with their practice squad the following day. Moss would be elevated to the active roster on November 27, 2021 ahead of the Bengals' home game against the 5-4-1 Pittsburgh Steelers. However, Moss would not play in that game because of a hamstring injury Moss suffered in pregame warmups.

On February 15, 2022, Moss signed a reserve/future contract. He was waived on August 30, 2022 and signed to the practice squad the next day. He was waived from the practice squad on September 5, 2022.

Personal life
Moss is the son of Pro Football Hall of Fame wide receiver Randy Moss.

References

External links
Cincinnati Bengals bio
LSU Tigers bio

1998 births
Living people
Players of American football from Charlotte, North Carolina
LSU Tigers football players
American football tight ends
Cincinnati Bengals players
NC State Wolfpack football players
Washington Football Team players